To the Gates of Blasphemous Fire is the second album by Ukrainian symphonic black metal band Nokturnal Mortum. This album was dedicated to Igor Naumchuk of Lucifugum.

Track listing 

 Notes
Lyrics have not been published for the song "Under the Banners of the Horned Knjaz"

References 

1998 albums
Nokturnal Mortum albums